The Dakota Prairie Grasslands (DPG) was formed in 1998.  It consists of four U.S. Forest Service Ranger District offices that manage four National Grasslands:

 North Dakota
 Cedar River National Grassland
 Little Missouri National Grassland
 Sheyenne National Grassland
 South Dakota
 Grand River National Grassland

History
All of these ranger districts were formerly part of the Custer National Forest based in Billings, Montana.  The Chief of the Forest Service created the DPG as a separate unit to help focus and better manage the issues and resources of the National Grasslands.

Administration
The Supervisor's office is located in Bismarck, North Dakota.  The Little Missouri National Grassland is administered from offices in Dickinson and Watford City.  The Sheyenne National Grassland is administered from the office in Lisbon.  The Grand River and Cedar River National Grasslands are administered from the office located in Lemmon, South Dakota.

See also
Shortgrass prairie
Tallgrass prairie

References

External links 
 Dakota Prairie Grasslands - U.S. Forest Service
 List of plant species on the Grand and Cedar River National Grasslands.
 List of bird species on the Grand and Cedar River National Grasslands.

National Grasslands of the United States
Grasslands of the North American Great Plains
Protected areas of North Dakota
Protected areas of South Dakota
2000 establishments in the United States
Grasslands of North Dakota
Grasslands of South Dakota